A Start in Life is a 1970 picaresque novel by the British writer Alan Sillitoe. It was followed by a sequel Life Goes On in 1985.

Synopsis
Michael Cullen abandons his pregnant girlfriend in Nottingham and heads south to London where he becomes mixed-up with a smuggling racket. Eventually caught and sent to prison, he eventually decides to return to a quiet life in the provinces.

References

Bibliography
 Gillian Mary Hanson. Understanding Alan Sillitoe. University of South Carolina Press, 1999 

1970 British novels
Novels by Alan Sillitoe
Novels set in London
W. H. Allen & Co. books